Erik Oscar Florén (born 3 May 1984) is a Swedish professional golfer.

Career
Florén was born in Mölndal near Gothenburg. He attended Texas Tech University in the United States where he was named an NCAA First Team All-American in 2006.

Since turning professional in 2007, he has competed on Europe's second tier Challenge Tour. In August 2010 he won for the first time at the SWALEC Wales Challenge, and went on to finish the season in 6th place on the Challenge Tour Rankings to graduate to the top level European Tour for 2011. At the end of a poor 2012 Floren successfully completed qualifying school.

Professional wins (1)

Challenge Tour wins (1)

Challenge Tour playoff record (0–1)

Results in major championships

CUT = missed the halfway cut
Note: Florén only played in The Open Championship.

Team appearances
Amateur
Jacques Léglise Trophy (representing Continental Europe): 2002
 European Youths' Team Championship (representing Sweden): 2004
Eisenhower Trophy (representing Sweden): 2004, 2006
European Amateur Team Championship (representing Sweden): 2005
Palmer Cup (representing Europe): 2006 (winners), 2007

Professional
European Championships (representing Sweden): 2018

See also
2010 Challenge Tour graduates
2012 European Tour Qualifying School graduates

External links

Oscar Florén at golfdata.se 
Oscar Florén at the Texas Tech Red Raiders official site

References

Swedish male golfers
Texas Tech Red Raiders men's golfers
European Tour golfers
Sportspeople from Västra Götaland County
People from Mölndal
1984 births
Living people